The Komodo language is a language spoken by the extinct  Komodo people, and present day inhabitants of Komodo Island, with a small population of speakers on mainland Flores. It belongs to the Austronesian language family, and is a separate language from Manggarai.

References

External links
 Komodo - Ethnologue

Sumba languages
Languages of Indonesia